Poeldijk is a village in the Dutch province of South Holland. It is a part of the municipality of Westland, and lies about 8 km southwest of The Hague.

In 2001, the village of Poeldijk had 5335 inhabitants. The built-up area of the village was 1.1 km2, and contained 3400 residences.
The statistical area "Poeldijk", which also can include the peripheral parts of the village, as well as the surrounding countryside, has a population of around 7080.

References

Populated places in South Holland
Westland (municipality), Netherlands